Avocettina is a genus of eels in the snipe-eel family Nemichthyidae. It currently contains the following species:

 Avocettina acuticeps (Regan, 1916) (Southern snipe-eel)
 Avocettina bowersii (Garman, 1899)
 Avocettina infans (Günther, 1878) (Avocet snipe-eel)
 Avocettina paucipora J. G. Nielsen & D. G. Smith, 1978

References

 

Nemichthyidae
Taxa named by David Starr Jordan